"Papercuts" is a song by Australian rapper Illy, which features Australian female folk/indie-pop vocalist Vera Blue and was produced by M-Phazes. The song was released on 8 July 2016 and peaked within the top 10 on the Australian ARIA Chart. The song is the lead single from Illy's fifth studio album, Two Degrees. "Papercuts" appears on the album as the sixth track.

Upon release, Illy said, "I've been holding on to 'Papercuts' for a while, and I'm really excited that it's finally coming out. It's a different vibe to anything I've done before."

Track listing

Commercial performance 
"Papercuts" debuted at number thirty-seven on the Australian ARIA singles chart, jumping to number eight then two in the following weeks, becoming both artists' highest-charting single to date.

Charts

Weekly charts

Year-end charts

Certifications

References 

Illy (rapper) songs
Vera Blue songs
2016 singles
2016 songs
Songs written by Vera Blue
Songs written by M-Phazes